Freeway is a Dutch rock group from Amersfoort, founded by Wim Bos (bass player) and Dick Visser (drums) on 1 March 1968. Their rock & roll-like style of music is broadly comparable to the Rolling Stones. The founding musicians were:
 Dick Visser      - drums and lead singer
 Wim Bos          - bass guitar
 Elly van Zoelen  - singer
 Roy Driessen     - rhythm guitar
 Gijs Westerning  - lead guitar

By adding a new lead singer George Legierse and replacement of both guitarists Gijs and Roy by Hans van Hamersveld the band was becoming better known outside the region of Utrecht.

History
During their early years the band played abroad, typically for the British Forces in Germany. They played many English songs, like the Rolling Stones, the Beatles and Them.

Once the singer asked a fellow if the English pronunciation of the songs was right. The chap had no problem with that. Over the years, many changes in the band's lineup has occurred, but Legierse and Van Hamersveld have been at the core of the band.

At the celebration party of George becoming 50 years old Hans had arranged a drummer, which George didn't recognise until he spoke some words. As a surprise it was actually the first drummer Dick Visser himself!
 
In 2006 Susan Langeveld joined the band for a short time. That was a chance to add some different style music. Jimi Hendrix, Joe Walsh and Susan Tedeschi songs were added.

The band collapsed in September 2006, which caused George to be left alone as only member of this band. In September 2007 George did gather the two guitarists from the band SHOCKPROOF (coverband), together with Ronnie Defilé (played about 15 years ago in Freeway). His father, Joop Defilé, once replaced Hans van Hamersveld, when he broke his hip. Theo, who had also left for almost a year, returned again and after five rehearsals the band had the courage to do a tryout on November 17. This was also the celebration of the 40 years that the band exists. More than 30 people visited this reunion, among them some former musicians of the band. Paaik, one of the three brothers of George, was invited to join on stage to sing some lyrics.

During this celebration the momentarely musicians where:
 George Legierse      - lead singer
 Jos van den Hoven    - guitar, sax, bluesharp 
 Willem van Doezelaar - guitar
 Theo van Marsbergen  - bass guitar (left band for 12 months but returned)
 Ronnie Defilé        - drums

On June 18, 2010 Band Lifepak (with singer Paaik Legierse) played together with Freeway in Café De Noot in Hoogland, where international artists regularly do their performances. See http://www.denoot.nl

George, who had some voice problems, recovered and the more he sang, the better his voice sounded. Both George and Hans have retired from working, but Theo and Marcel have still daily jobs beside the band.

After 48 years (going for the 50) at this moment on stage (2016 at Kingsday 27 April):
 George Legierse     - lead singer 
 Hans van Hamersveld - guitar 
 Theo van Marsbergen - bass guitar 
 Marcel Gunsing      - drums 
On september 30 2018 .we have celebrated our 50 years anniversary in Amersfoort, the city, where Freeway was founded with Dick Visser and Roy Driessen, where we have played several songs from the beginning. As a gift for the audience and Freeway, one of the drummers, had a performance of the Band "Queens&Ko" with Queens Liz and Herma as Queens. In Holland a "King" is called "Koning" and the name of the drummer was "KO"(ning). Still there where people who asked for a next performance of Freeway.

Dutch rock music groups